Back to the Real is the debut studio album by Reel Tight, released in April 1999 on G-Funk Records.

Singles
The lead single "(Do You) Wanna Ride" peaked at No. 32 on the Billboard Hot R&B/Hip-Hop Songs charts. A cover of Earth, Wind & Fire's Reasons also reached No. 22 on the Billboard Adult R&B Songs chart.

Track listing
"(Do You) Wanna Ride"- 3:31  
"I Want U"- 3:48  
"I Lied"- 3:02  
"I'm So Sorry"- 4:11  
"No More Pain"- 5:08  
"Don't Wake Me"- 4:38  
"How Can I See"- 4:56  
"Lady"- 4:33  
"Sittin in the Club"- 4:36  
"Don't Be Afraid"- 5:19  
"It's a Lulu Ya'll"- :40  
"Reasons"- 6:03  
"Thank You Lord"- 1:25  
"(Do You) Wanna Ride" (Diplomar Remix)- 4:25

Charts

References

1999 debut albums
Restless Records albums
Albums produced by Warren G